Catarina Taborda (born 7 November 1989) is a Bissau-Guinean politician. She was Secretary of State for Tourism and Crafts under the government of Aristides Gomes.

She is a member of the Democratic Convergence Party. She served as Director General of Crafts, Director of Services for Promotion and Tourism Events, and consultant at the international company Grand Thornton, graduated in Commerce, and was a candidate for Deputy in the 24th Electoral Circle.

References 

1989 births
Living people
21st-century women politicians
Government ministers of Guinea-Bissau
Women government ministers of Guinea-Bissau